The officers of the New South Wales Marine Corps commanded the first European military unit to be stationed on the Australian continent. Commissioned to guard convicts aboard the First Fleet to Botany Bay in 1788, they subsequently enforced discipline at penal colonies in Port Jackson and Norfolk Island. The New South Wales Marines were disbanded from 1791 to 1792 as their enlistment term expired. The majority of officers returned to equivalent roles in the British Marines.

Background
The New South Wales Marine Corps was an ad hoc volunteer unit created by the Royal Navy to guard the convicts aboard the First Fleet to Australia, and to preserve "subordination and regularity" in the penal colony in New South Wales. The Corps was established on 31 August 1786 with assent from King George III for a force of Marines and accompanying officers to enforce "... subordination and obedience in the settlement [at Botany Bay], as well as for defence of that settlement against the incursions of the natives." At full strength the New South Wales Marine Corps numbered 213 men.

Both officers and men were entitled to an honourable discharge after three years of colonial service, as an alternative to the British Marine tradition of enlistment for life. Rates of pay were in accordance with equivalent ranks in the British Marines including routine provision of a subsistence allowance worth two-thirds of daily pay. British Marines received the allowance when in the field (i.e., not serving on board a vessel); the New South Wales Marines received the allowance for the duration of their three-year enlistment, relieving the Admiralty or the government of the colony of the responsibility of providing messing facilities.

Officers wore a red long-tailed doublet, white trousers, black shoes with gaiters, and a black headdress. They were authorised to carry swords and sidearms in addition to the Brown Bess musket available to all personnel.

Marine Corps officers

References

Bibliography

Royal Marines officers
Convictism in New South Wales
18th-century Royal Marines personnel
Military units and formations established in 1786